Javier "Javi" Cueto Suárez (born 11 January 2001) is a Spanish footballer who plays as a forward for Atlético Madrid B, on loan from Oviedo B.

Club career
Born in Gijón, Asturias, Cueto joined Real Oviedo's youth setup in 2016, from Caudal Deportivo. He made his senior debut with the reserves on 20 October 2018, coming on as a second-half substitute for Edu Cortina in a 2–1 Segunda División B away win against SD Amorebieta.

Cueto scored his first senior goal on 5 May 2019, netting the opener in a 1–1 draw at CD Izarra. On 31 July 2020, he renewed his contract with the club.

Cueto made his professional debut on 19 September 2020, replacing Borja Sánchez in a 1–1 away draw against CD Mirandés in the Segunda División.

On 15 July 2022, Cueto was loaned to Segunda Federación side Atlético Madrid B, for one year.

References

External links

2001 births
Living people
Footballers from Gijón
Spanish footballers
Association football forwards
Segunda División players
Segunda División B players
Real Oviedo Vetusta players
Real Oviedo players
Spain youth international footballers